Hajji Tahereh (also Romanized as Ḩājjī Ţāhereh and Ḩājī Ţāhereh; also known as Hājī Tāher, Ḩājjī Ţāher, and Ḩājjī Ţāherī) is a village in Zirab Rural District, in the Central District of Zarrin Dasht County, Fars Province, Iran. At the 2006 census, its population was 704, in 142 families.

References 

Populated places in Zarrin Dasht County